Stadion Pakansari is an all-seater stadium at Pakansari, Cibinong, Bogor, West Java in Indonesia. It is mostly used for football matches and is the home stadium of Persikabo 1973. It can hold 30,000 spectators. The stadium is one of the venues for men's football in the 2018 Asian Games and 2018 AFC U-19 Championship.

History
Stadion Pakansari is an all-seater stadium located in Bogor Regency in the West Java province of Indonesia. It was opened in 2015. Indonesia played their 2016 AFF Championship semifinal and final matches here in Pakansari because of the renovations at GBK. The stadium hosted the 2017 President's Cup final. It also hosted the 2018 Asian Games men's football gold medal match and the 2018 AFC U-19 Championship final. It is the home of Liga 1 club TIRA-Persikabo.

PSM Makassar played their 2019 AFC Cup matches here in Stadion Pakansari as their permanent home.

International matches hosted

Tournament results

2016 AFF Championship

2018 PSSI Anniversary Cup

2018 Asian Games Men's Football

2018 AFC U-19 Championship

Events

International
2016 AFF Championship
2018 PSSI Anniversary Cup
2018 Asian Games men's football

National
2017 Indonesia President's Cup Third places and Final.

Gallery

See also
Patriot Candrabhaga Stadium
Wibawa Mukti Stadium
Si Jalak Harupat Stadium
Gelora Bandung Lautan Api Stadium
List of stadiums in Indonesia

References

External links 
 Stadium information

TIRA-Persikabo
Buildings and structures in West Java
Multi-purpose stadiums in Indonesia
Sports venues in Indonesia
Football venues in Indonesia
Athletics (track and field) venues in Indonesia
Sports venues in West Java
Multi-purpose stadiums in West Java
Football venues in West Java
Athletics (track and field) venues in West Java
Venues of the 2018 Asian Games
Asian Games football venues
Sports venues completed in 2015